The Embassy of Italy in Ottawa is Italy's embassy in Canada. It is located at 275 Slater Street, 21st floor, in Ottawa, the Canadian capital. 

Italy operates Canadian regional consulates in Montreal, Toronto and Vancouver. Honorary consuls are also appointed in Calgary, Guelph, Halifax, Hamilton, Kelowna, London, Niagara Falls, Regina, Sarnia, Sudbury,  Thunder Bay, Windsor (ON) and Winnipeg.

See also
 Canada–Italy relations

External links
Embassy of Italy in Ottawa
Consulate General of Italy in Edmonton
Consulate General of Italy in Montreal
Consulate General of Italy in Toronto
Consulate General of Italy in Vancouver
 , Department of Foreign Affairs and International Trade (Canada), August 2007

Italy
Ottawa
Canada–Italy relations